Gösta Rodin (April 18, 1902 – June 6, 1982) was a Swedish screenwriter and film director.

Selected filmography
 Love and the Home Guard (1931)
 Wife for a Day (1933)
 Äventyr på hotell (1934)
 The People of Småland (1935)
 The Pale Count (1937)
 A Cruise in the Albertina (1938)
 Oh, What a Boy! (1939)
 The Train Leaves at Nine (1941)
 Evening at the Djurgarden (1946)

References

Bibliography
 Wallengren, Ann-Kristin.  Welcome Home Mr Swanson: Swedish Emigrants and Swedishness on Film. Nordic Academic Press, 2014.
 Wright, Rochelle. The Visible Wall: Jews and Other Ethnic Outsiders in Swedish Film. SIU Press, 1998.

External links

1902 births
1982 deaths
Swedish film directors
People from Stockholm
Swedish screenwriters
Swedish film editors